Jefferson County is a county in the U.S. state of Wisconsin. As of the 2020 census, the population was 84,900. Its county seat is Jefferson. Jefferson County comprises the Watertown-Fort Atkinson, WI Micropolitan Statistical Area, which is also included in the Milwaukee-Racine-Waukesha, WI Combined Statistical Area.

History
Jefferson County was created in 1836 as part of Wisconsin Territory and was organized in 1839.  Jefferson County was founded by "Yankee" settlers from New England. It was named after Jefferson County, New York, where some of the original settlers came from. The town of Watertown, Wisconsin, was named after Watertown, New York, in Jefferson County, New York.

Geography

Major highways

Railroads
Canadian Pacific
Union Pacific
Wisconsin and Southern Railroad

Buses
List of intercity bus stops in Wisconsin

Airports
 Watertown Municipal Airport (KRYV) provides services for the county and surrounding communities.
 Fort Atkinson Municipal Airport (61C), enhances county service.

Adjacent counties
 Dodge County - north
 Waukesha County - east
 Walworth County - southeast
 Rock County - southwest
 Dane County - west

Demographics

As of the census of 2020, the population was 84,900. The racial makeup of the county was 88.5% White, 1.0% Black or African American, 0.8% Asian, 0.4% Native American, 3.4% from other races, and 5.8% from two or more races. Ethnically, the population was 8.3% Hispanic or Latino of any race.

As of the census of 2010, there were 83,686 people, 32,117 households, and 21,872 families residing in the county. The population density was 133 people per square mile (51/km2).  There were 30,092 housing units at an average density of 54 per square mile (21/km2). The county's racial makeup was 96.34% White, 0.28% Black or African American, 0.34% Native American, 0.45% Asian, 0.02% Pacific Islander, 1.65% from other races, and 0.93% from two or more races. 4.09% of the population were Hispanic or Latino of any race. 55.1% were of German, 6.1% Norwegian, 6.0% Irish and 5.1% American ancestry.

There were 28,205 households, out of which 33.20% had children under the age of 18 living with them, 58.50% were married couples living together, 8.20% had a female householder with no husband present, and 29.50% were non-families. 23.60% of all households were made up of individuals, and 9.60% had someone living alone who was 65 years of age or older. The average household size was 2.55 and the average family size was 3.02.

In the county, the population was spread out, with 25.20% under the age of 18, 8.50% from 18 to 24, 30.40% from 25 to 44, 23.20% from 45 to 64, and 12.60% who were 65 years of age or older. The median age was 37 years. For every 100 females there were 98.40 males. For every 100 females age 18 and over, there were 96.80 males.

In 2017, there were 861 births, giving a general fertility rate of 53.7 births per 1000 women aged 15–44, the eleventh lowest rate out of all 72 Wisconsin counties.

The Dwight Foster Public Library, which serves as the resource library for the county, had a total service population of 19,095 in 2010. It is a member of the Bridges Library System.

Government
The County Board of Supervisors, with 30 members, serves as the legislative body for the county. There are seven elected officials in addition to the County Board of Supervisors. County-wide partisan elections are held in November. The County Board's members are elected for two-year terms during a spring non-partisan election. The County Board is responsible for the county administrator. The County Board elects a chairman, vice-chairman, and second vice-chairman.

Politics
Jefferson County has been primarily Republican since 1940. Only three Democratic presidential candidates have won the county since then, in 1964, 1996, and 2008. Lyndon B. Johnson in 1964 is the last Democratic Party candidate to win a majority of the county's votes.

Communities

Cities
 Fort Atkinson
 Jefferson (county seat)
 Lake Mills
 Waterloo
 Watertown (partly in Dodge County)
 Whitewater (mostly in Walworth County)

Villages
 Cambridge (mostly in Dane County)
 Johnson Creek
 Lac La Belle (mostly in Waukesha County)
 Palmyra
 Sullivan

Towns

 Aztalan
 Cold Spring
 Concord
 Farmington
 Hebron
 Ixonia
 Jefferson
 Koshkonong
 Lake Mills
 Milford
 Oakland
 Palmyra
 Sullivan
 Sumner
 Waterloo
 Watertown

Census-designated places
 Hebron
 Helenville
 Ixonia
 Lake Koshkonong
 Lake Ripley
 Rome

Unincorporated communities

 Aztalan
 Blackhawk Island
 Busseyville
 Carcajou
 Cold Spring
 Concord
 Ebenezer
 Farmington
 Glenn Oaks Beach
 Heath Mills
 Hoopers Mill
 Hubbleton
 Jefferson Junction
 Koshkonong (partial)
 Koshkonong Manor
 Koshkonong Mounds
 Kroghville
 Lake Lac La Belle
 London (partial)
 Maranatha Baptist University (College Campus)
 Milford
 North Shore
 Oakland
 Pipersville
 Portland (partial)
 Slabtown
 Sylvan Mounds
 Vinnie Ha Ha

Education
School districts (all K-12) include:

 Cambridge School District
 Edgerton School District
 Fort Atkinson School District
 Jefferson School District
 Johnson Creek School District
 Kettle Moraine School District
 Lake Mills Area School District
 Oconomowoc Area School District
 Palmyra-Eagle Area School District
 Waterloo School District
 Watertown School District
 Whitewater School District

See also
 National Register of Historic Places listings in Jefferson County, Wisconsin

References

External links

 Jefferson County
 Daily Jefferson County Union newspaper

 
1839 establishments in Wisconsin Territory
Populated places established in 1839